Another Nice Mess is a 1972 comedy film written and directed by Bob Einstein and starring Rich Little as Richard Nixon and Herb Voland as Spiro Agnew.

Plot
The film is presented in the style of a Laurel and Hardy comedy, with Nixon in the Oliver Hardy role, and Agnew in the Stan Laurel role.

Cast

 Rich Little as Richard Nixon 
 Herb Voland as Spiro Agnew
 Bruce Kirby as Adolph
 Diahn Williams as Anita
 Stewart Bradley as Guilford
 Magda Harout as Duchess of Zanzig
 Steve Martin as Hippie (in his film debut)

Production
The film was produced by Tom Smothers and Jonathan Haze. The film had a budget of between $250,000 and $1,000,000.

Reception
The film made $30,000 at the box office and was subsequently buried by Smothers for 40 years who said "It was a terrible film", co-producer Haze said "Another Nice Mess was a mess."

See also
 List of American films of 1972

References

External links

1972 films
American satirical films
Films about Richard Nixon
Cultural depictions of Richard Nixon
Cultural depictions of Laurel & Hardy
American political satire films
1972 comedy films
1972 directorial debut films
1970s political comedy films
1970s English-language films
1970s American films